Crocco's theorem is an aerodynamic theorem relating the flow velocity, vorticity, and stagnation pressure (or entropy) of a potential flow. Crocco's theorem gives the relation between the thermodynamics and fluid kinematics. The theorem was first enunciated by Alexander Friedmann for the particular case of a perfect gas and published in 1922:

However, usually this theorem is connected with the name of Italian scientist Luigi Crocco, a son of Gaetano Crocco.

Consider an element of fluid in the flow field subjected to translational and rotational motion: because stagnation pressure loss and entropy generation can be viewed as essentially the same thing, there are three popular forms for writing Crocco's theorem:

 Stagnation pressure:  
 Entropy (the following form holds for plane steady flows):  
 Momentum: 

All quantities considered (entropy, enthalpy, and body force) are specific, in the sense of "per unit mass".

References 

Fluid dynamics
Aerodynamics